KonKoma are a London-based Afro-funk band signed to Soundway Records. The band fuse Afro-funk and Afrobeat with the influences of American blaxploitation-era soul and 1960s psychedelia.

Members

KonKoma features among its members two highly esteemed Ghanaian musicians - Alfred "Kari" Bannerman and Emmanuel Rentzos - who have shared the stage with artists including Peter Green (founding member of Fleetwood Mac) and Hugh Masekela as well as both having been long-standing members of the Afro-rock group Osibisa.

List of members

 Emmanuel Rentzos (vocals, keyboards)
 Reginald "JoJo" Yates (vocals, mbira, sepriwa, percussion)
 Alfred "Kari" Bannerman (guitar, vocals)
 Nii Tagoe (vocals, percussion)
 Jose Joyette (drums)
 Derrick McIntyre (bass guitar)
 Scott Baylis (trumpet)
 Max Grunhard (alto & baritone saxophone)
 Ben Hadwen (baritone saxophone, flute)

Releases

KonKoma's self-titled debut LP was produced by Max Grunhard and Benedic Lamdin (Nostalgia 77) and recorded and mixed by Mike Pelanconi (aka Prince Fatty) in Brighton.

References

Afro-beat musical groups